Karamahmutlu is a village in Bor district of Niğde Province, Turkey. At  it is situated to the east of Turkish state highway  which connects Niğde to Mediterranean coast. The population of Karamahmutlu was 163 as of 2011.

References 

Villages in Bor District, Niğde